Polar Class (PC) refers to the ice class assigned to a ship by a classification society based on the Unified Requirements for Polar Class Ships developed by the International Association of Classification Societies (IACS). Seven Polar Classes are defined in the rules, ranging from PC 1 for year-round operation in all polar waters to PC 7 for summer and autumn operation in thin first-year ice.

The IACS Polar Class rules should not be confused with International Code for Ships Operating in Polar Waters (Polar Code) by the International Maritime Organization (IMO).

Background 
The development of the Polar Class rules began in the 1990s with an international effort to harmonize the requirements for marine operations in the polar waters in order to protect life, property and the environment. The guidelines developed by the International Maritime Organization (IMO), which were later incorporated in the Polar Code, made reference to the compliance with Unified Requirements for Polar Ships developed by the International Association of Classification Societies (IACS). In May 1996, an "Ad-Hoc Group to establish Unified Requirements for Polar Ships (AHG/PSR)" was established with one working group concentrating on the structural requirements and another working on machinery-related issues. The first IACS Polar Class rules were published in 2007.

Prior to the development of the unified requirements, each classification society had their own set of ice class rules ranging from Baltic ice classes intended for operation in first-year ice to higher vessel categories, including icebreakers, intended for operations in polar waters. When developing the upper and lower boundaries for the Polar Classes, it was agreed that the highest Polar Class vessels (PC 1) should be capable of operating safely anywhere in the Arctic or the Antarctic waters at any time of the year while the lower boundary was set to existing tonnage operating during the summer season, most of which followed the Baltic ice classes with some upgrades and additions. The lowest Polar Class (PC 7) was thus set to the similar level with the Finnish-Swedish ice class 1A. The definition of operational conditions for each Polar Class was intentionally left vague due to the wide variety of ship operations carried out in polar waters.

Definition

Polar Class notations 

The IACS has established seven different Polar Class notations, ranging from PC 1 (highest) to PC 7 (lowest), with each level corresponding to operational capability and strength of the vessel. The descriptions given in the rules are intended to guide owners, designers and administrations in selecting the appropriate Polar Class to match the intended voyage or service of the vessel. Ships with sufficient power and strength to undertake "aggressive operations in ice-covered waters", such as escort and ice management operations, can be assigned an additional notation "Icebreaker".

The two lowest Polar Classes (PC 6 and PC 7) are roughly equivalent to the two highest Finnish-Swedish ice classes (1A Super and 1A, respectively). However, unlike the Baltic ice classes intended for operation only in first-year sea ice, even the lowest Polar Classes consider the possibility of encountering multi-year ice ("old ice inclusions").

Requirements 
In the Polar Class rules, the hull of the vessel is divided longitudinally into four regions: "bow", "bow intermediate", "midbody" and "stern". All longitudinal regions except the bow are further divided vertically into "bottom", "lower" and "icebelt" regions. For each region, a design ice load is calculated based on the dimensions, hull geometry, and ice class of the vessel. This ice load is then used to determine the scantlings and steel grades of structural elements such as shell plating and frames in each location. The design scenario used to determine the ice loads is a glancing impact with ice.

In addition to structural details, the Polar Class rules have requirements for machinery systems such as the main propulsion, steering gear, and systems essential for the safety of the crew and survivability of the vessel. For example, propeller-ice interaction should be taken into account in the propeller design, cooling systems and sea water inlets should be designed to work also in ice-covered waters, and the ballast tanks should be provided with effective means of preventing freezing.

Although the rules generally require the ships to have suitable hull form and sufficient propulsion power to operate independently and at continuous speed in ice conditions corresponding to their Polar Class, the ice-going capability requirements of the vessel are not clearly defined in terms of speed or ice thickness. In practice, this means that the Polar Class of the vessel may not reflect the actual icebreaking capability of the vessel.

Polar Class ships  

The IACS Polar Class rules apply for ships contracted for construction on or after 1 July 2007. This means that while vessels built prior to this date may have an equivalent or even higher level of ice strengthening, they are not officially assigned a Polar Class and may not in fact fulfill all the requirements in the unified requirements. In addition, particularly Russian ships and icebreakers are assigned ice classes only according to the requirements of the Russian Maritime Register of Shipping, which maintains its own ice class rules parallel to the IACS Polar Class rules.

Although numerous ships have been built to the two least hardened Polar Classes, PC6 and PC7, only a small number of ships have been assigned ice class PC5 or higher.

Polar Class 5 

A number of research vessels intended for scientific missions in the polar regions are built to PC5 rating: the South African S. A. Agulhas II in 2012, the American Sikuliaq in 2014, and the British RRS Sir David Attenborough in 2020. In addition, a PC5 Antarctic vessel is under construction for the Chilean Navy . 

In 2012, the Royal Canadian Navy awarded a shipbuilding contract for the construction of six to eight Arctic Offshore Patrol Ships (AOPS) rated at PC5. , HMCS Harry DeWolf has entered service, HMCS Margaret Brooke is undergoing post-acceptance trials, HMCS Max Bernays is undergoing builder's sea trials, HMCS William Hall and HMCS Frédérick Rolette are under construction, and HMCS Robert Hampton Gray is on order. Two additional ships have been ordered for the Canadian Coast Guard.

, four cruise ships have been built with PC5 rating: National Geographic Endurance (delivered in 2020) and National Geographic Resolution (2021) for Lindblad Expeditions, and SH Minerva (2021) and SH Vega (2022) for Swan Hellenic.

Polar Class 4 

The 2012-built drillship Stena IceMAX has a hull strengthened according to PC4 requirements.

The Canadian shipping company Fednav operates two PC4 rated bulk carriers, 2014-built Nunavik and 2021-built Arvik I. The 28,000-tonne vessels are primarily used to transport nickel ore from Raglan Mine in the Canadian Arctic.  

In 2015, the hull of the Finnish 1986-built icebreaker Otso was reinforced with additional steel to PC4 level to allow the vessel to support seismic surveys in the Arctic during the summer months.

The Finnish LNG-powered icebreaker Polaris, built in 2016, is rated PC4 with an additional Lloyd's Register class notation "Icebreaker(+)". The latter part of the notation refers to additional structural strengthening based on analysis of the vessel's operational profile and potential ice loading scenarios.

The interim icebreakers CCGS Captain Molly Kool, CCGS Jean Goodwill, and CCGS Vincent Massey, built in 2000–01 and acquired by the Canadian Coast Guard 2018, will be upgraded to PC4 rating as part of the vessels' conversion to Canadian service.

The new PC4 polar logistics vessel of the Argentine Navy intended to complement the country's existing icebreaker ARA Almirante Irízar in Antarctica is currently in design stage.

The Japan Agency for Marine-Earth Science and Technology (JAMSTEC) is in the process of acquiring a new PC4 rated icebreaker for researching the Arctic region.

Polar Class 3 

The first PC3 vessels were two heavy load carriers, Audax and Pugnax, built for the Netherlands-based ZPMC-Red Box Energy Services in 2016.

In April 2015, it was reported that Edison Chouest would build two PC3 anchor handling tug supply vessels (AHTS) for Alaskan operations. However, the construction of the vessels due for delivery by the end of 2016 was later cancelled following Shell Oil's decision to halt Arctic oil exploration.

, three polar research vessels have been built with PC3 rating: Kronprins Haakon for the Norwegian Polar Institute in 2018, Xue Long 2 for the Polar Research Institute of China in 2019, and Nuyina for the Australian Antarctic Division in 2021. Kronprins Haakon also has the additional notation "Icebreaker" while Nuyina notation includes Lloyd's Register's "Icebreaker(+)" notation.

The Finnish multipurpose icebreakers Fennica and Nordica, built in the early 1990s, were assigned PC3 rating as part of the vessels' Polar Code certification in 2019.

, there are no PC3 rated vessels under construction.

Polar Class 2 

, the only PC2 rated vessel in service is the expedition cruise ship Le Commandant Charcot operated by the French company Compagnie du Ponant.

The United States Coast Guard has ordered two out of three planned PC2 rated heavy polar icebreakers referred to as Polar Security Cutters. The first vessel, USCGC Polar Sentinel, is expected to enter service in 2025. While the vessels these Polar Security Cutters are intended to replace, USCGC Polar Star and USCGC Polar Sea, are sometimes referred to as Polar-class icebreakers, these mid-1970s icebreakers do not carry a PC rating.

The proposed new polar icebreaker for the Canadian Coast Guard, CCGS John G. Diefenbaker, is designed to PC2 rating with an additional notation "Icebreaker(+)". While the vessel was initially scheduled for delivery in 2017, the National Shipbuilding Strategy has since been revised to include two such icebreakers, the first of which is planned to enter service by December 2029.

Polar Class 1 

, no ships have been built, under construction or planned to PC1, the highest ice class specified by the IACS.

Notes

References

External links 
 Unified Requirements for Polar Class ships, International Association of Classification Societies (IACS)
 

Shipbuilding
Icebreakers
Sea ice